Succonet were a tribe of Native Americans living near modern Falmouth, Massachusetts in the 1620s.

See also 
 Native American tribes in Massachusetts

References

Native American tribes in Massachusetts